The Turkish alphabet is a Latin-script alphabet used for writing the Turkish language, consisting of 29 letters, seven of which (Ç, Ğ, I, İ, Ö, Ş and Ü) have been modified from their Latin originals for the phonetic requirements of the language. This alphabet represents modern Turkish pronunciation with a high degree of accuracy and specificity. Mandated in 1928 as part of Atatürk's Reforms, it is the current official alphabet and the latest in a series of distinct alphabets used in different eras. 

The Turkish alphabet has been the model for the official Latinization of several Turkic languages formerly written in the Arabic or Cyrillic script like Azerbaijani (1991), Turkmen (1993), and recently Kazakh (2021).

History

Early reform proposals and alternate scripts
The earliest known Turkic alphabet is the Orkhon script, also known as the Old Turkic alphabet, the first surviving evidence of which dates from the 7th century. In general, Turkic languages have been written in a number of different alphabets including Uyghur, Cyrillic, Arabic, Greek, Latin, and some other Asiatic writing systems.

Ottoman Turkish was written using a Turkish form of the Arabic script for over 1,000 years. It was poorly suited to write works that incorporated a great deal of Arabic and Persian vocabulary as their spellings were largely unphonetic and thus had to be memorized. This created a significant barrier of entry as only highly formal and prestige versions of Turkish were top heavy in Arabic and Persian vocabulary. Not only would students have trouble predicting the spellings of certain Arabic and Persian words, but some of these words were so rarely used in common speech that their spellings would not register in the collective conscious of students. However, it was much better suited to the Turkish part of the vocabulary. Although Ottoman Turkish was never formally standardized by a decree of law, words of Turkic origin largely had de facto systematic spelling rules associated with them which made it easier to read and write. On the rare occasion a Turkic word had irregular spelling that had to be memorized, there was often a dialectal or historic phonetic rationale that would be validated by observing the speech of eastern dialects, Azeri, and Turkmen. Whereas Arabic is rich in consonants but poor in vowels, Turkish is the opposite; the script was thus inadequate at distinguishing certain Turkish vowels and the reader was forced to rely on context to differentiate certain words. The introduction of the telegraph in the 19th century exposed further weaknesses in the Arabic script, although this was buoyed to some degree by advances in the printing press and Ottoman Turkish Keyboard typewriters.

Some Turkish reformists promoted the adoption of the Latin script well before Atatürk's reforms. In 1862, during an earlier period of reform, the statesman Münuf Pasha advocated a reform of the alphabet. At the start of the 20th century similar proposals were made by several writers associated with the Young Turks movement, including Hüseyin Cahit, Abdullah Cevdet, and Celâl Nuri. The issue was raised again in 1923 during the first Economic Congress of the newly founded Turkish Republic, sparking a public debate that was to continue for several years.

A move away from the Arabic script was strongly opposed by conservative and religious elements. It was argued that Romanisation of the script would detach Turkey from the wider Islamic world, substituting a "foreign" (i.e. European) concept of national identity for the traditional sacred community. Others opposed Romanisation on practical grounds; at that time there was no suitable adaptation of the Latin script that could be used for Turkish phonemes. Some suggested that a better alternative might be to modify the Arabic script to introduce extra characters to better represent Turkish vowels. In 1926, however, the Turkic republics of the Soviet Union adopted the Latin script, giving a major boost to reformers in Turkey.

Turkish-speaking Armenians used the Mesrobian script to write Holy Bibles and other books in Turkish for centuries. Karamanli Turkish was, similarly, written with a form of the Greek alphabet.

Introduction of the modern Turkish alphabet

The current 29-letter Turkish alphabet was established as a personal initiative of the founder of the Turkish Republic, Mustafa Kemal Atatürk. It was a key step in the cultural part of Atatürk's Reforms, introduced following his consolidation of power. Having established a one-party state ruled by his Republican People's Party, Atatürk was able to sweep aside the previous opposition to implementing radical reform of the alphabet. He announced his plans in July 1928 and established a Language Commission consisting of the following members:

 Ragıp Hulusi Özden
 İbrahim Grantay
 Ahmet Cevat Emre
 Mehmet Emin Erişirgil
 İhsan Sungu
 Avni Başman
 Falih Rıfkı Atay
 Ruşen Eşref Ünaydın
 Yakup Kadri Karaosmanoğlu
 Ali Haydar Taner

The commission was responsible for adapting the Latin script to meet the phonetic requirements of the Turkish language. The resulting Latin alphabet was designed to reflect the actual sounds of spoken Turkish, rather than simply transcribing the old Ottoman script into a new form.

Atatürk himself was personally involved with the commission and proclaimed an "alphabet mobilisation" to publicise the changes. He toured the country explaining the new system of writing and encouraging the rapid adoption of the new alphabet. The Language Commission proposed a five-year transition period; Atatürk saw this as far too long and reduced it to three months. The change was formalised by the Turkish Republic's law number 1353, the Law on the Adoption and Implementation of the Turkish Alphabet, passed on 1 November 1928. Starting 1 December 1928, newspapers, magazines, subtitles in movies, advertisement and signs had to be written with the letters of the new alphabet. From 1 January 1929, the use of the new alphabet was compulsory in all public communications as well the internal communications of banks and political or social organisations. Books had to be printed with the new alphabet as of 1 January 1929 as well. The civil population was allowed to use the old alphabet in their transactions with the institutions until 1 June 1929.

In the Sanjak of Alexandretta (today's province of Hatay), which was at that time under French control and would later join Turkey, the local Turkish-language newspapers adopted the Latin alphabet only in 1934.

The reforms were also backed up by the Law on Copyrights, issued in 1934, encouraging and strengthening the private publishing sector. In 1939, the First Turkish Publications Congress was organised in Ankara for discussing issues such as copyright, printing, progress on improving the literacy rate and scientific publications, with the attendance of 186 deputies.

Political and cultural aspects
As cited by the reformers, the old Arabic script was much more difficult to learn than the new Latin alphabet. The literacy rate did indeed increase greatly after the alphabet reform, from around 10% to over 90%,  but many other factors also contributed to this increase, such as the foundation of the Turkish Language Association in 1932, campaigns by the Ministry of Education, the opening of Public Education Centres throughout the country, and Atatürk's personal participation in literacy campaigns.

Atatürk also commented on one occasion that the symbolic meaning of the reform was for the Turkish nation to "show with its script and mentality that it is on the side of world civilisation". The second president of Turkey, İsmet İnönü further elaborated the reason behind adopting a Latin alphabet:

The alphabet reform cannot be attributed to ease of reading and writing. That was the motive of Enver Pasha. For us, the big impact and the benefit of an alphabet reform was that it eased the way to cultural reform. We inevitably lost our connection with Arabic culture.

The Turkish writer Şerif Mardin has noted that "Atatürk imposed the mandatory Latin alphabet in order to promote the national awareness of the Turks against a wider Muslim identity. It is also imperative to add that he hoped to relate Turkish nationalism to the modern civilisation of Western Europe, which embraced the Latin alphabet." The explicitly nationalistic and ideological character of the alphabet reform showed in the booklets issued by the government to teach the population the new script. They included sample phrases aimed at discrediting the Ottoman government and instilling updated Turkish values, such as: "Atatürk allied himself with the nation and drove the sultans out of the homeland"; "Taxes are spent for the common properties of the nation. Tax is a debt we need to pay"; "It is the duty of every Turk to defend the homeland against the enemies." The alphabet reform was promoted as redeeming the Turkish people from the neglect of the Ottoman rulers: "Sultans did not think of the public, Ghazi commander [Atatürk] saved the nation from enemies and slavery. And now, he declared a campaign against ignorance [illiteracy]. He armed the nation with the new Turkish alphabet."

The historian Bernard Lewis has described the introduction of the new alphabet as "not so much practical as pedagogical, as social and cultural – and Mustafa Kemal, in forcing his people to accept it, was slamming a door on the past as well as opening a door to the future". It was accompanied by a systematic effort to rid the Turkish language of Arabic and Persian loanwords, often replacing them with revived early Turkic words. However, the same reform also rid the language of many Western loanwords, especially French, in favor of Turkic words, albeit to a lesser degree. Atatürk told his friend Falih Rıfkı Atay, who was on the government's Language Commission, that by carrying out the reform, "we were going to cleanse the Turkish mind from its Arabic roots."

Yaşar Nabi, a leading journalist, argued in the 1960s that the alphabet reform had been vital in creating a new Western-oriented identity for Turkey. He noted that younger Turks, who had only been taught the Latin script, were at ease in understanding Western culture but were quite unable to engage with Middle Eastern culture. The new script was adopted very rapidly and soon gained widespread acceptance. Even so, older people continued to use the Turkish Arabic script in private correspondence, notes and diaries until well into the 1960s.

Letters

The following table presents the Turkish letters, the sounds they correspond to in International Phonetic Alphabet and how these can be approximated more or less by an English speaker.

{| class="wikitable"
!Uppercase
!Lowercase
!Name 
!Name (IPA)
!Value
!English approximation
|-
| style="text-align:center" | A || style="text-align:center" | a || a ||  ||  || As a in father
|-
| style="text-align:center" | B || style="text-align:center" | b || be ||  ||  || As b in boy
|-
| style="text-align:center" | C || style="text-align:center" | c || ce ||  ||  || As j in joy
|-
| style="text-align:center" | Ç || style="text-align:center" | ç || çe ||  ||  || As ch in chair
|-
| style="text-align:center" | D || style="text-align:center" | d || de ||  ||  || As d in dog
|-
| style="text-align:center" | E || style="text-align:center" | e || e ||  ||  || As e in red
|-
| style="text-align:center" | F || style="text-align:center" | f || fe ||  ||  || As f in far
|-
| style="text-align:center" | G || style="text-align:center" | g || ge ||  || ,  || As g in got
|-
| style="text-align:center" | Ğ || style="text-align:center" | ğ || yumuşak ge ||  ||,   || —
|-
| style="text-align:center" | H || style="text-align:center" | h || he, ha, haş || ,  ||  || As h in hot
|-
| style="text-align:center" | I || style="text-align:center" | ı || ı ||  ||  || Somewhat like i in cousin; see Close back unrounded vowel
|-
| style="text-align:center" | İ || style="text-align:center" | i || i ||  ||  || As ee in feet
|-
| style="text-align:center" | J || style="text-align:center" | j || je ||  ||  || As s in measure
|-
| style="text-align:center" | K || style="text-align:center" | k || ke, ka || ,  || ,  || As k in kit
|-
| style="text-align:center" | L || style="text-align:center" | l || le ||  || ,  || As l in love
|-
| style="text-align:center" | M || style="text-align:center" | m || me ||  ||  || As m in man
|-
| style="text-align:center" | N || style="text-align:center" | n || ne ||  ||  || As n in nice
|-
| style="text-align:center" | O || style="text-align:center" | o || o ||  ||  || As o in more
|-
| style="text-align:center" | Ö || style="text-align:center" | ö || ö ||  ||  || As ur in nurse, with lips rounded
|-
| style="text-align:center" | P || style="text-align:center" | p || pe ||  ||  || As p in pin
|-
| style="text-align:center" | R || style="text-align:center" | r || re ||  ||  || As r in great
|-
| style="text-align:center" | S || style="text-align:center" | s || se ||  ||  || As s in song
|-
| style="text-align:center" | Ş || style="text-align:center" | ş || şe ||  ||  || As sh in show
|-
| style="text-align:center" | T || style="text-align:center" | t || te ||  ||  || As t in tick
|-
| style="text-align:center" | U || style="text-align:center" | u || u ||  ||  || As oo in pool
|-
| style="text-align:center" | Ü || style="text-align:center" | ü || ü ||  ||  || Somewhat like u in tune; see Close front rounded vowel
|-
| style="text-align:center" | V || style="text-align:center" | v || ve ||  ||  || As v in vat
|-
| style="text-align:center" | Y || style="text-align:center" | y || ye ||  ||  || As y in yes
|-
| style="text-align:center" | Z || style="text-align:center" | z || ze ||  ||  || As z in zigzag
|-
| style="text-align:center" | Q || style="text-align:center" | q || kû, kü || ,  || — || —
|-
| style="text-align:center" | W || style="text-align:center" | w || çift ve ||  || — || —
|-
| style="text-align:center" | X || style="text-align:center" | x || iks ||  || — || —
|}

Of the 29 letters, eight are vowels (A, E, I, İ, O, Ö, U, Ü); the other 21 are consonants.

Dotted and dotless I are distinct letters in Turkish such that ⟨i⟩ becomes ⟨İ⟩ when capitalised, ⟨I⟩ being the capital form of ⟨ı⟩.

In the case of length distinction, these letters are used for old Arabic and Persian borrowings from the Ottoman Turkish period, most of which have been eliminated from the language. Native Turkish words have no vowel length distinction, and for them the circumflex is used solely to indicate palatalisation.

Turkish orthography is highly regular and a word's pronunciation is usually identified by its spelling.

Distinctive features

Dotted and dotless I are separate letters, each with its own uppercase and lowercase forms. The lowercase form of I is ı, and the lowercase form of İ is i.  (In the original law establishing the alphabet, the dotted İ came before the undotted I; now their places are reversed.) The letter J, however, uses a tittle in the same way English does, with a dotted lowercase version, and a dotless uppercase version.

Optional circumflex accents can be used with "â", "î" and "û" to disambiguate words with different meanings but otherwise the same spelling, or to indicate palatalisation of a preceding consonant (for example, while   means "snow",   means "profit"), or long vowels in loanwords, particularly from Arabic.

Software localisation 

In software development, the Turkish alphabet is known for requiring special logic,  particularly due to the varieties of i and their lowercase and uppercase versions. This has been called the Turkish-I problem.

Keyboard layout

The standard Turkish keyboard layouts for personal computers are shown below. The first is known as Turkish Q, the second as Turkish F.

See also
Common Turkic Alphabet
Turkish Braille
Turkish phonology
Uniform Turkic Alphabet

References

External links
Yunus Emre Enstitusu – Online Learning
The Turkish Alphabet
Online Turkish
Turkish Alphabet Pronunciation
 Dilek Nur Polat Ünsür (22 Mac 2021). "How Newspapers Familiarized Readers with the Latin Script During the Turkish Alphabet Reform", ATypI 2020 presentation

Alphabet
Latin alphabets
Spelling reform
Writing systems introduced in 1928
Alphabets used by Turkic languages

mn:Түрк хэл бичиг